The Andersson Family (Swedish: Familjen Andersson) is a 1937 Swedish comedy film directed by Sigurd Wallén and starring Wallén, Elsa Carlsson and Inga-Bodil Vetterlund.  It was shot at the Råsunda Studios in Stockholm. The film's sets were designed by the art director Arne Åkermark.

Cast
 Sigurd Wallén as 	Kalle Andersson
 Elsa Carlsson as 	Maria Andersson
 Inga-Bodil Vetterlund as 	Elsa Andersson
 Hilda Borgström as Kalle's Mother
 Allan Bohlin as Erik Bruhn
 Björn Berglund as	Pelle Karlsson
 Hilding Gavle as 	Pettersson
 Karin Albihn as 	Therése Garpe
 Ragnar Widestedt as Garpe, banker
 Arthur Fischer as 	Konsul Bruhn
 Gudrun Brost as Lisa
 Carl Browallius as Amiral Sörenholm
 Carl Ström as 	Major
 Emma Meissner as Mrs. Sörenholm
 Märtha Lindlöf as 	Mrs. Wallander
 Karin Granberg as Mrs. Lönnqvist
 Karin Appelberg-Sandberg as Mrs. Pettersson 
 Hildur Lithman as Generalkonsulinnan
 Hugo Björne as 	Lawyer Nyhlén
 Emil Fjellström as 	Kalles vän 
 Einar Lindström as 	Gurra Svensson 
 Yngve Nyqvist as 	Waiter 
 Georg Skarstedt as 	Tvätteriarbetare 
 Inga-Lill Åhström as 	Tvätteriarbeterska

References

Bibliography 
 Qvist, Per Olov & Von Bagh, Peter . Guide to the Cinema of Sweden and Finland. Greenwood Publishing Group, 2000.
 Wallengren, Ann-Kristin.  Welcome Home Mr Swanson: Swedish Emigrants and Swedishness on Film. Nordic Academic Press, 2014.

External links 
 

1937 films
Swedish comedy films
1937 comedy films
1930s Swedish-language films
Films directed by Sigurd Wallén
Swedish films based on plays
Swedish black-and-white films
1930s Swedish films